The Salt Lake City Marathon is an annual marathon foot-race run in Salt Lake City, Millcreek and Holladay, Utah.  It was first held in 2004.

The race begins at the Olympic Legacy Bridge at the University of Utah, runs through the center of Salt Lake City, and ends at Library Square.  A bike tour held on the same day uses the same course, but starts earlier in the morning.  A half marathon also starts with the marathon.

History
The marathon was first organized in 2004 by Devine Racing, a Chicago-based race organization company.

In 2005, a bike tour was added. In 2006, a half-marathon was added, and the date of the race was moved from April to June. In 2007, the date was moved back to April.

Prior to the 2009 event, reports surfaced that the winners from the 2008 race had not been paid their prize winnings.  Devine Racing reportedly made those payments prior to the 2009 race commencing.

In February 2012, the Salt Lake City Marathon was purchased from Devine by US Road Sports & Entertainment Group. The 2012 event saw "no major flaws" and plentiful water, toilets, and medical aid stations.

The 2020 in-person edition of the race was first postponed to 2021 due to the coronavirus pandemic, before being cancelled altogether.  Registrants were first given the option of running the race virtually in 2020 or transferring their entry to 2021, before those that chose the latter option were then given the option of running the race virtually in 2021 or transferring their entry to 2022.

Course 

The course begins near the foothills of the city at the Olympic Legacy Bridge at the University of Utah in Salt Lake City. The marathon takes runners through the heart of Salt Lake City and the northern part of the Salt Lake Valley offering beautiful views of the local foothills and surrounding Wasatch mountains.

Starting at an elevation of just over 4,800 feet, the course winds its way from the foothills to the lower elevations with the half marathon course offering mostly flat, downhill running.

The half marathon and the full marathon are run simultaneously and share a common start line on the Olympic Legacy Bridge as the event begins.

The course will often follow the base of the Wasatch mountains into neighborhoods of neighboring Millcreek and Holladay as it winds through local Salt Lake streets and by nearby neighborhoods and local businesses towards major boulevards near the finish line in downtown Salt Lake City.

A bike tour follows the entire length of the marathon course and has a time limit of 1 hour and 45 minutes.

Winners 

Key: Course record (in bold)

References

External links
Official Site
US Road Sports & Entertainment Group (Organizers)

Marathons in the United States
Sports in Salt Lake City
Salt Lake County, Utah
Millcreek, Utah
Recurring sporting events established in 2004
2004 establishments in Utah
Sports competitions in Utah